Chesiadini is a tribe of geometer moths under subfamily Larentiinae. The tribe was described by Stephens in 1850.

Recognized genera
 Amygdaloptera Gumppenberg, 1887
 Aplocera Stephens, 1827
 Carsia Hübner, 1825
 Chesias Treitschke, 1825
 Chesistege Viidalepp, 1990
 Coenotephria Prout, 1914
 Docirava Walker, [1863]
 Epiphryne Meyrick, 1883
 Lithostege Hübner, 1825
 Odezia Boisduval, 1840
 Schistostege Hübner, 1825

References

"Tribus Chesiadini Stephens, 1850". BioLib.cz. Retrieved April 24, 2019.